Massira may refer to :
 Al Massira Airport, Agadir, Morocco international airport
 Jeunesse Massira, a sport club
 Stade El Massira, a multi-use stadium in Safi, Morocco